John Eyre (1847-1927)  was a British artist who  decorated and designed British pottery.  He also illustrated books and painted genre paintings. He is known for his paintings of Royal Hospital Chelsea and its veteran residents, as well as for paintings of working people in the pottery industry.  He was a member of the Royal Society of British Artists (c. 1877), the Royal Institute of Painters in Watercolours (1917) and Honorary Associate of the Royal College of Art (late in life).

Baptized in 1850 at Stoke-on-Trent, Eyre grew up in an artist's family. His father was a decorative artist in Staffordshire Potteries. Eyre got his education, studying art at South Kensington. Initially, he followed his father into the pottery trade, designing and decorating pottery. He worked for Mintons, and progressed to become an art director at Doulton of Lambeth.

He exhibited artwork at the Royal Academy in 1877, Burlington House, Royal Institute of Painters in Watercolours, Paris Salon, and the Ipswich Art Society.

Gallery

Illustrated
In addition to his ceramic artwork and paintings, John Eyre illustrated classic books, including the Pickwick Papers by Charles Dickens, In Memoriam A.H.H. by Alfred Tennyson Tennyson, The seaside and fireside and Voices of the night by Henry Wadsworth Longfellow, the Compleat Angler by Izaak Walton and Charles Cotton, Rip Van Winkle and Christmas Eve by Washington Irving.

He also illustrated Old Ballads, a book of folk music published about 1907, and Carol Adair by M. B Manwell.

See also
John Eyre (painter) Australian painter

References

External links 
Floral painted vases by John Eyre.
Floral vases closeup.
Vases with Classical Greek motif, by John Eyre.
Greek vases closeup.

1847 births
1927 deaths
19th-century English painters
20th-century English painters